Metantithyra silvestrella is a moth in the family Xyloryctidae, and the only species in the genus Metantithyra. The species and genus were both described by Pierre Viette in 1957 and are found on La Réunion.

References

Xyloryctidae
Xyloryctidae genera
Monotypic moth genera
Taxa named by Pierre Viette